Phallus duplicatus (common name, netted stinkhorn or wood witch) is a species of fungus in the stinkhorn family. The bell-shaped to oval cap is green-brown, the cylindrical stalk is white. When mature the cap becomes sticky with a slimy green coating that attracts flies that disperse its spores, and it has a distinct, "netted" universal veil. The fungus is edible when still in the "egg" stage, before the fruit body has expanded. It grows often in public lawns, and can also be found in meadows.

Taxonomy
The species was first described in 1811 by French botanist Louis Bosc. Synonyms include Dictyophora duplicata and Hymenophallus duplicatus.

It is commonly known as the netted stinkhorn or the wood witch.

Description
Immature fruit bodies are roughly spherical, whitish to pink in color, and have thick rhizomorphs at the base. Its surface is covered with chambers and pits, and there is a perforation at the tip with a white rim. A white, lacy, skirt-like veil, or indusium, hangs below the cap. The cap is initially covered with a foetid greenish slime, the gleba. Spores are cylindrical, hyaline (translucent), smooth, and measure 3.5–4.2 by 1–1.5 μm. Fruit bodies are edible when still in the "egg" stage.

The species resembles Phallus indusiatus, but that species has a longer indusium and smaller spores.

Habitat and distribution
Phallus duplicatus is a saprobic species, and fruit bodies grow singly or in small groups on the ground in woods, gardens, and landscaped areas. The smelly gleba coating the cap attracts flies and other insects that consume it and help to disperse the spores.

It is known from Asia (China and Japan), eastern North America, and South America (Brazil). The species was featured in a Paraguayan postage stamp in 1986. Although it has been widely recorded from Europe, some of these may be misidentifications with the similar Phallus impudicus var. togatus. Phallus duplicatus  is Red Listed in the Ukraine.

References

External links
 Phallus duplicatus at Mushroom Expert

Phallales
Fungi of Europe
Fungi of North America
Fungi of South America
Fungi described in 1811
Taxa named by Louis Augustin Guillaume Bosc